Cañas River is a river of Costa Rica. It is a tributary of the Tempisque River.

References

Rivers of Costa Rica